Shotwick Park is a civil parish in Cheshire West and Chester, England.  It contains two buildings that are recorded in the National Heritage List for England as designated listed buildings, both of which are listed at Grade II.  This grade is the lowest of the three gradings given to listed buildings and is applied to "buildings of national importance and special interest". The parish is entirely rural and the listed buildings are structures associated with Shotwicklodge Farm.

See also
Listed buildings in Puddington
Listed buildings in Saughall
Listed buildings in Shotwick

References

Listed buildings in Cheshire West and Chester
Lists of listed buildings in Cheshire